In geometry, an icosahedral prism is a convex uniform 4-polytope (four-dimensional polytope). This 4-polytope has 22 polyhedral cells: 2 icosahedra connected by 20 triangular prisms. It has 70 faces: 30 squares and 40 triangles. It has 72 edges and 24 vertices.

It can be constructed by creating two coinciding icosahedra in 3-space, and translating each copy in opposite perpendicular directions in 4-space until their separation equals their edge length.

It is one of 18 convex uniform polyhedral prisms created by using uniform prisms to connect pairs of parallel Platonic solids or Archimedean solids.

Alternate names
 Icosahedral dyadic prism Norman W. Johnson 
 Ipe for icosahedral prism/hyperprism (Jonathan Bowers)
 Snub tetrahedral prism/hyperprism

Related polytopes 

External links 
 
 

4-polytopes